Malumel is a locality in the Thodiyoor Panchayat of Kollam district, Kerala, India. The village belongs to Karunagappally Taluk.

References

Villages in Kollam district